San Antone is the fourth studio album by American country music artist Dan Seals. The album charted at #24 on the Top Country Albums chart. The singles, "(You Bring Out) The Wild Side of Me", "My Baby's Got Good Timing", and "My Old Yellow Car" charted at #9, 2, and 9, respectively. This is his second album for Liberty Records. "One Friend" was later re-recorded for his 1987 album The Best, from which it was released as a single.

Track listing

Personnel 
 Dan Seals – lead and backing vocals, acoustic guitar (4)
 David Thompson – acoustic guitar (1)
 Bobby Thompson – acoustic guitar (2, 3, 5, 6)
 Thom Schuyler – acoustic guitar (7, 8)
 Rafe Van Hoy – acoustic guitar (11)
 Steve Gibson – electric guitar (1-10), rhythm electric guitar (1, 4), gut-string guitar (1), electric guitar solo (3), acoustic guitar (5, 7, 8, 9)
 Joe Stanley – electric guitar solo (1)
 Larry Byrom – lead electric guitar (4)
 Doyle Grisham – steel guitar (1, 3, 5, 6, 8, 10)
 David Briggs – electric piano (1, 3, 5), acoustic piano (2, 6)
 Kyle Lehning – synthesizers (1, 5, 7)
 Shane Keister – vocoder (2, 9, 11), acoustic piano (4, 6, 7, 8, 10), organ (4), electric piano (7, 10), Yamaha DX7 (9)
 David Hungate – bass (1-6, 9)
 Norbert Putnam – bass (7, 8, 10)
 Larrie Londin – drums (1-10)
 Farrell Morris – percussion (5)
 Hoot Hester – fiddle (6, 7, 8, 10)
 Bergen White – string arrangements (3, 5, 9, 11)
 The Nashville String Machine – strings (3, 5, 9, 11)
 Wendy Waldman – backing vocals (5)

Production 
 Producer – Kyle Lehning
 Engineers – Joseph Bogan and Kyle Lehning
 Assistant Engineers – Keith Odle and Kirt Odle
 Recorded at Emerald Sound Studios (Nashville, TN).
 Mixed and Overdubbed at Morningstar Studios (Spring Hills, PA).
 Mastered by Doug Sax at The Mastering Lab (Hollywood, CA).
 Art Direction – Henry Marquez
 Design – Peter Shea 
 Photography – Mark Tucker
 Management – Tony Gottlieb at Morningstar Management.

Chart performance

Weekly charts

Year-end charts

Singles

References

1984 albums
Dan Seals albums
Liberty Records albums
Albums produced by Kyle Lehning